Lieutenant general (Ret.) Sukiman (born 10 August 1953) is an Indonesian politician of the Gerindra political party, who is currently serving as the seventh regent of Rokan Hulu since 2018.

References 

1953 births
Indonesian politicians
Mayors and regents of places in Riau
Living people